Hounds for Heroes is a British charity launched in February 2010 to help train and provide service dogs to wounded British Armed Forces and Emergency Services men and women.

Background
Hounds for Heroes was founded in 2009 and registered in February 2010 by Allen Parton, an ex-servicemen who had suffered a traumatic head injury whilst serving in the Gulf in 1991. The charity was set up in both the memory of his original Assistance dog Endal, who was sadly euthanized on 13 March 2009, and to help the injured.

Objectives
According to the organization's official website, "The purpose of 'Hounds for Heroes' is to provide specially trained assistance dogs to injured and disabled men and women of both the UK Armed Forces and Civilian Emergency Services.Through this provision our aims are to provide help and practical support, leading to an enhanced quality of life for our clients."

Their initial goal was to raise £100,000 to purchase and train 5 Labrador puppies to serve as service dogs for injured men and women from the armed forces and emergency services.  The organization receives no public funding, and depends entirely upon contributions.

External links
Official website

Media
  ITV Television
  BBC television

References

Animal charities based in the United Kingdom
British veterans' organisations
Charities based in Hampshire
Dog welfare organizations
2009 establishments in the United Kingdom
Organizations established in 2009